Pommerhelix is a genus of air-breathing land snails, terrestrial pulmonate gastropod molluscs in the subfamily Hadrinae  of the family Camaenidae.

Species 
Species within the genus Pommerhelix include:
 Pommerhelix carmelae S. A. Clark, 2009
 Pommerhelix depressa (Hedley, 1901)
 Pommerhelix duralensis (Cox, 1868)
 Pommerhelix exocarpi (Cox, 1868)
 Pommerhelix insularis S. A. Clark, 2009
 Pommerhelix mastersi (Cox, 1864)
 Pommerhelix monacha (Pfeiffer, 1859) 
 Pommerhelix stanisici S. A. Clark, 2009

References

 Bank, R. A. (2017). Classification of the Recent terrestrial Gastropoda of the World. Last update: July 16th, 2017

Gastropods of Australia
Camaenidae